"You've Changed" is a 1941 song by Bill Carey and Carl Fischer.

You've Changed may also refer to:

 You've Changed Records, a Canadian independent record label
 You've Changed (album), a 1992 album by jazz saxophonist Jimmy Heath
 "You've Changed" (Sia song), 2010
 "You've Changed", a 2005 song by Keyshia Cole from the album The Way It Is

See also
"You Changed", a song from the Kelly Rowland album Talk a Good Game
"You Changed Me", a 2015 song by Jamie Foxx featuring Chris Brown